In the skeleton of humans and other animals, a tubercle, tuberosity or apophysis is a protrusion or eminence that serves as an attachment for skeletal muscles. The muscles attach by tendons, where the enthesis is the connective tissue between the tendon and bone. A tuberosity is generally a larger tubercle.

Main tubercles

Humerus
The humerus has two tubercles, the greater tubercle and the lesser tubercle. These are situated at the proximal end of the bone, that is the end that connects with the scapula.  The greater/lesser tubercule is located from the top of the acromion laterally and inferiorly.

Radius
The radius has two, the radial tuberosity and Lister's tubercle.

Ribs
On a rib, tubercle is an eminence on the back surface, at the junction between the neck and the body of the rib. It consists of an articular and a non-articular area. The lower and more medial articular area is a small oval surface for articulation with the transverse process of the lower of the two vertebrae which gives attachment to the head. The higher, non-articular area is a rough elevation which gives attachment to the ligament of the tubercle. The tubercle is much more prominent in the upper ribs than in the lower ribs.

Tibia
The most prominent tubercle of the tibia, a leg bone which is more commonly known as the shinbone or shankbone, is the tibial tuberosity.  The tibial tuberosity is located on the tibia's anterior surface, distal to the medial condyle. It creates a bony prominence just below the patella, and can be easily located with the fingers. It creates an attachment point for the ligamentum patellae, or patellar ligament. Other tubercles of the tibia include the medial intercondylar tubercle, the lateral intercondylar tubercle, and Gerdy's tubercle.

Femur
A trochanter is one of up to three tubercles of the femur:
 Greater trochanter
 Lesser trochanter
 Third trochanter, which is occasionally present

Fifth metatarsal

In the fifth metatarsal bone, the most proximal part of the bone is termed the "tuberosity", and the secondary ossification center that is normally present thereon in children is termed the "apophysis".

Related diseases and conditions

Fractures
The main type of fracture affecting tubercles is avulsion fracture, by pulling the attached tendon.

Apophysitis
Apophysitis is an inflammation of a tubercle. It mainly affects growing children, with overuse of the affected tubercle. Examples include:
Osgood–Schlatter disease (apophysitis of the tibial tubercle)
Sever's disease (apophysitis of the posterior tubercle of the heel)
Sinding-Larsen and Johansson syndrome (apophysitis of the inferior pole of the patella)

Enthesitis

Enthesitis is an anatomically close but separate condition, wherein there is inflammation of the entheses, the sites where tendons or ligaments insert into the bone. It is associated with HLA B27 arthropathies such as ankylosing spondylitis, psoriatic arthritis, and reactive arthritis.

References

Skeletal system